Wicked Wonderland may refer to:
Wicked Wonderland (album), 2009 studio album by American rock-musician Lita Ford
"Wicked Wonderland" (song), 2014 song by Norwegian DJ and producer Martin Tungevaag